Now Dehak (also known as Now Deh, Naudeh, and Nūda) is a village in Narjeh Rural District, in the Central District of Takestan County, Qazvin Province, Iran. At the 2006 census, its population was 196, in 54 families.

References 

Populated places in Takestan County